Anthony Robinson (born 1931) is an American novelist and short story writer. He is professor emeritus of English and the former director of the creative writing program at the State University of New York at New Paltz.

Personal life
The son of novelist Henry Morton Robinson, he grew up in the Maverick Artists Colony in Woodstock, New York. He graduated from Phillips Academy Andover (1949) and Columbia University (cum laude, 1953), where Mark Van Doren and George Nobbe encouraged him to pursue a career in writing.

He served on active duty in the United States Navy Reserve from 1953 to 1956 in the final days of the Korean War, ultimately attaining the rank of lieutenant. He then received his M.A. in English from Columbia in 1960.

Robinson joined the New Paltz faculty in 1964 and remained there (spending the academic year of 1971–1972 teaching at the University of Paris at Vincennes) until his retirement in 2000.

His first marriage ended in 1976 with the death of his wife, Mary. He remarried in 1998, to artist Tatiana Padwa, a childhood friend from Woodstock. He has two children, Jennifer and Henry, from his first marriage.

Career
A story he wrote aboard ship, “The Farlow Express,” was published in Prairie Schooner and was later included in The Best American Short Stories of 1957.

His first novel, A Departure From the Rules, the story of the worst peacetime disaster in the history of the United States Navy, drew on his Navy experience, and was cited by critics for its "extraordinary skill" (Chicago 1960). He then turned his attention to the moral issues of contemporary society in The Easy Way, praised for its "insights into the legal profession" (Buffalo), Home Again, Home Again, which drew on his experience in the Maverick Artists Colony, "for which the author has a visible attachment" (Levin), and The Whole Truth, "an attention-grabber that will not let go until the last words have been read" (Times-Herald). His 1991 novel, The Member-Guest, has been described as "the consummate golf novel" (Falco).

Bibliography

Books
A Departure from the Rules (novel; Putnam, 1960)
The Easy Way (novel; Simon & Schuster, 1963)
Home Again, Home Again (novel; William Morrow, 1969)
The Whole Truth (novel; Donald I. Fine, 1990)
The Member-Guest (novel; Donald I. Fine, 1991)
The American Golfer (novel; CreateSpace, 2010)
The Floodplain (novel; Codhill Press, 2011)
New Water (short stories; CreateSpace, 2013)
Father of the Man; (novel; CreateSpace, 2018)

Short StoriesMy Finnegan (1949)The Farlow Express (1956)The Lesson (1961)The Dirt Machine (1964)Navy Buttons (1965)A Turn In The Match (1982)Zerk the Jerk (1985)The 3-Mile Run (2007)

ReferencesWho's Who in America Buffalo Evening News, Buffalo, NY, February 23, 1963Chicago Sunday Tribune, March 20, 1960
Falco, Edward. Roanoke Times & World-News, Roanoke, VA, October 20, 1991
Levin, Martin. The New York Times Book Review, January 19, 1969St. Petersburg Times, St. Petersburg, FL, January 13, 1963The Times-Herald, Newport News, VA, July 8, 1990Kingston Daily Freeman'', Kingston, NY, July 16, 2010

External links
Anthony Robinson's Official Website

20th-century American novelists
21st-century American novelists
American male novelists
University at Albany, SUNY faculty
Novelists from New York (state)
1931 births
Living people
People from Woodstock, New York
20th-century American male writers
21st-century American male writers
Military personnel from New York (state)
Columbia College (New York) alumni
United States Navy personnel of the Korean War
United States Navy officers
United States Navy reservists